Aidan Joseph "AJ" Roach (born 7 September 1990 in Darlinghurst) is an Australian male water polo player. At the 2012 and 2016 Summer Olympics, he competed for the Australia men's national water polo team in the men's event. He also competed at the 2011 World Aquatics Championships.

Roach was picked in the water polo Sharks squad to compete in the men's water polo tournament at the 2020 Summer Olympics. Coached by  Elvis Fatović, the team finished joint fourth on points in their pool but their inferior goal average meant they finished fifth overall and out of medal contention. They were able to upset Croatia in a group stage match 11–8. Australia at the 2020 Summer Olympics details the results in depth.

He is the son of former professional rugby league footballer Steve Roach.

References

External links
 

1990 births
Living people
Australian male water polo players
Olympic water polo players of Australia
Water polo players at the 2012 Summer Olympics
Water polo players at the 2016 Summer Olympics
Water polo players from Sydney
Water polo players at the 2020 Summer Olympics
Sportsmen from New South Wales